Male is a former hamlet and today a quarter in the east of Sint-Kruis, a suburb of Bruges, West Flanders, Belgium. The hamlet, which retains its small historic center, clusters around Male Castle, best known as the birthplace of Louis, count of Flanders in 1329.

External links

Castles.nl
Damme-online.com:Male, birthplace of the Count of Flanders

Populated places in West Flanders
Geography of Bruges